Khnumhotep and Niankhkhnum were ancient Egyptian royal servants. They shared the title of Overseer of the Manicurists in the Palace of King Nyuserre Ini, sixth pharaoh of the Fifth Dynasty, reigning during the second half of the 25th century BC. They were buried together at Saqqara and are listed as "royal confidants" in their joint tomb. They are notable for their unusual depiction in Egyptian records, often interpreted as the first recorded same-sex couple.

Family
Khnumhotep and Niankhkhnum are believed by scholars, including Thomas Dowson, and Greg Reeder, to be the first recorded same-sex couple in ancient history.  The assumed romantic relationship between Khnumhotep and Niankhkhnum is based on depictions of the two men standing nose to nose and embracing. Niankhkhnum's wife, depicted in a banquet scene, was almost completely erased in antiquity, and in other pictures Khnumhotep occupies the position usually designated for a wife. Their official titles were "Overseers of the Manicurists of the Palace of the King". Critics argue that both men appear with their respective wives and children, suggesting the men were brothers, rather than lovers.

Khnumhotep and Niankhkhnum are depicted in the tomb with their respective families. It has been proposed that they were the sons of Khabaw-khufu and Rewedzawes. They appear to have had three brothers named Titi, Nefernisut, and Kahersetef. Three possible sisters are also attested. They are named Neferhotep-hewetherew, Mehewet and Ptah-heseten. Niankhkhnum's wife was named Khentikawes. The couple appear in the tomb with three sons named Hem-re, Qed-unas and Khnumhezewef, and three daughters, Hemet-re, Khewiten-re and Nebet. At least one grandson is attested, Irin-akheti, the son of Hem-re and his wife, Tjeset.

Khnumhotep had a wife by the name of Khenut. Khnumhotep and Khenut had at least five sons named Ptahshepses, Ptahneferkhu, Kaizebi, Khnumheswef and Niankhkhnum the younger (possibly named after the tomb owner), as well as a daughter named Rewedzawes.

Careers

Khnumhotep and Niankhkhnum were the head manicurists for the royal family, but held a number of different official titles and duties. Both or either men held the following titles:

 m-r jr ant pr aA "overseer of manicurists (literally, 'those who do fingernails') in the palace."
 sHD jr ant pr aA "inspector of manicurists in the palace"
 Hrj sStA "guardian of secrets"
 rx nswt "king's acquaintance"
 zXAw nswt "king's scribe"
 mHnk nswt "confidant of the king"
 jr xt nswt "keeper of the king's things"
 mrr nb.f "one who is beloved of his lord"
 Hm-nTr ra m Szp jb ra "sun priest in the (place where the sun-god) Ra's heart receives welcome," that is, in Nyuserre's solar temple at Abu Ghurab
 wab mn swt nj-wsr-ra "purity attendant of the enduring places of Nyuserre" (a cleaner-priest in this king's pyramid complex at Abusir).
 wab nswt "one who purifies the king." (a personal priest to the king)
 nb jmAx nTr aA "lord of those who are honored before the great god" (an aspirational title signifying donations to the individual's mortuary estate from the king.

On duty at the sun temple, Niankhkhnum or Khnumhotep may have watched over subordinate officials, such as the m-r pr Sna "overseer of the magazines" who in turn supervised crews of porters stocking and withdrawing material from the granaries and store-rooms.

Care of the king's body and wardrobe in preparation for his public appearances required a large number of aides, apparently working in different ateliers each under its own leadership. In addition to the manicurists whom Niankhkhnum and Khnumhotep supervised, the palace had attendants under one or more men holding the title jrj nfr HAt "keeper of the headdress," responsible for the king's wigs and headcloths, jrw Snj " hairdressers, who kept him shaven, and an m-r n jzwj Xkrwt nswt "overseer of the two chambers of king's adorners." The post of Xkrt nswt "adorner of the king" was always held by women, who were legally, if not socially, equal to men in Egypt. Neferhotep-Hathor is labeled with this status at the funeral procession of Niankhkhnum and Khnumhotep.

How, or how often, personnel in the hairdressers' shop, which from titulary evidence stands higher than the manicurists in 5th and 6th Dynasty prestige rankings, communicated with the latter remains unknown. No hairdressers are labeled at the funeral procession. Ptahshepses, the keeper of the headdress who became Nyussere's vizier, and Ti, overseer of the pyramids and sun temples, are two officials whom Niankhkhnum and Khnumhotep may have worked with. Both Khnumhotep and Niankhkhnum are attested on a harvest scene in the splendid burial estate of Ptahshepses, where they may have been quarry supervisors, yet named as jr ant pr aA "palace manicurists," quite junior to titulary in their own tomb, which could mean Ptahshepses died while they were younger. A door jamb, besides TAtj "vizier," displays the title HAt-a "one whose arm is in front," a pure honorific Allen distinguishes from the m-r and jrj titles specifying responsibility domains we've encountered up to now. The jrj nfr HAt "keeper of the headdress" epithet, recorded in many of the rooms, is spelled with the mouth sign (Gardiner D21), not the eye sign (D4), so that it shares the introductory word of jrj-pat "hereditary prince," another of Allen's honorifics.

The tomb

The tomb of Khnumhotep and Niankhkhnum was discovered by Egyptologist Ahmed Moussa in the necropolis at Saqqara, Egypt in 1964, during the excavation of the causeway for the pyramid of King Unas. It is the only tomb in the necropolis where men are displayed embracing and holding hands. In addition, the men's chosen names (both theophorics to the creator-god Khnum) form a linguistic reference to their closeness: Niankhkhnum means "life belongs to Khnum" and Khnumhotep means "Khnum is satisfied;" 
The precise king and regnal date of this tomb are unknown; style places it in the latter 5th Dynasty under Nyuserre or Menkauhor. No human remains were discovered inside. It is believed the tomb was built in stages, first a sequence of two chambers cut into the limestone of a low escarpment in the northern area of Saqqara, then a surface-built mastaba structure added to mate with the earlier construction. This would have occurred as the two intended occupants gained resources.

In a banquet scene, Niankhkhnum and Khnumhotep are entertained by dancers, clappers, musicians and singers; in another, they oversee their funeral preparations. In the most striking portrayal, the two embrace, noses touching, in the most intimate pose allowed by canonical Egyptian art, surrounded by what would appear to be their heirs.

Layout and decoration

Forecourt entrance with architrave and pillars 
A two-pillared portico makes up the eastern half of the mastaba's façade. The front is inscribed with Niankhkhnum depicted on the left, Khnumhotep on the right. These two reliefs are virtually identical, only the names being different.

Interior of forecourt 
This space is fairly small. The west side is decorated with a funerary procession for Niankhkhnum and the east side shows a matching funerary procession for Khnumhotep.

 The uppermost south wall shows the two men seated before an offering table. Niankhkhnum is seated on the right, while Khnumhotep is seated on the left. The table with offerings stretches out between them. Below the offering scene the two men are depicted netting fowl and fishing. On the left, below this lintel, Khnumhotep stands on a papyrus boat, spearing fish in the water that floods the bases of papyrus stalks he drifts among. He is accompanied by his wife Khenut, sons and a daughter. On the right, Niankhkhnum is depicted in a similar manner, aiming his throw stick at the waterfowl although the active arm is now missing from this piece.

Outer vestibule 

At the entrance scenes of baking bread and brewing beer are depicted. Barley is carefully measured out and turned into bread. Other scenes include goat herding, ship building, harvesting scenes, sailing, netting of birds, etc. The east wall contains a legal text. Below this text several people are depicted thought to be the family of the two men. At the very bottom ships are shown. The men are shown standing before the main cabin of the ship.

Court (open to sky) 
An undecorated space which serves to connect the vestibule and chambers on the north end of the mastaba with the abutting rock-cut sections of the tomb to their south. Modern security grates now obstruct much of the full sun that would have flooded this small, walled yard, yet little or no sun fell on the vestibule to the outer rock-cut hall described below, as its entrance faces north.

Inner vestibule 
With names, titles, and standing portraits of the two men, it is much smaller than the other vestibule and without pillars. The lintel's inside surface features another cattle count scene, and each tomb owner appears on one of the side walls with his wife, amid a flow of yet more offerings from the herds.

Outer hall 

This outer hall, an antechamber to the final, inner hall, marks the tomb's first, rock-cut phase of construction, and is fully decorated. Before the mastaba was added, it would have been the first room a visitor entered after passing through the forecourt, which was relocated northeast to the far side of the mastaba where it is now. Here, people engage in agricultural occupations including the weighing of corn and grain, the ploughing of fields, and harvesting.

A double doorway to the inner hall is on the west wall, with a broad pillar dividing the doors. Its surface depicts the two men, their children, drawn much smaller to reflect a lesser status, in tow behind each parent. The respective wives do not appear in this scene. Niankhkhnum has three sons and three daughters, Khnumhotep five sons and one daughter, some of whom may be adopted or conceived by a second wife or mistress as they lack the shendyt kilts worn by the others. All the children except Niankhkhnum's youngest son, who still runs naked with his shaved head bearing the single sidelock of youth, are adults despite the scale they are drawn at. Ptahshepses, a son of Khnumhotep, wore the youth sidelock in the marsh scene of the forecourt but not so here. Either inconsistency intrudes, or the art, completed over years, reflects some changes of status which transpire during the tomb's construction.

Inner hall 
 Now on the reverse side of the dividing pillar,  Niankhknum and Khnumhotep embrace again, and a third time on the opposite wall of this small chamber. They are without their children in this innermost sanctuary. Each man has a "false door," a carved, slot-like niche surrounded by inscriptions which was produced in the royal workshops and installed in the tomb. Niankhknum's is seriously damaged. The false door provided an accessway for the deceased, as a spiritual being, to reach offerings left at the tomb by the living. These offerings were to be set on plinths in front of the false doors. Behind the false doors is a small statue closet known as the serdab. A statue of each man would have been placed here, facing the chamber as if to watch visitors come and go, but invisible to the offering-bringers since the false doors are actually solid. It appears that tomb robbers removed the statues in antiquity; they are no longer extant.

Deaths and burial

The longevity of the owners, and the circumstances of their deaths are unknown. The limestone sarcophagi beneath the mastaba were ransacked and wooden coffins of later date interred in the burial chambers. Booth, citing others, adheres to the theory that Khnumhotep died first, leaving Niankhkhnum to complete the tomb's art. This conclusion was drawn from Khnumhotep's jmAx epithets (see Titulary section), a style of beard he wears, and exclusion of his wife at the banquet scene when Niankhknum's was originally there. In Reeder's interpretation, absence of Khnumhotep's parents here matching absence of his wife at the banquet, is consistent with Khnumhotep predeceasing his afterlife partner.. 

Uncertain precise relationship connects Niankhkhnum and Khnumhotep as well; Altenmüller considers them brothers, Baines that they were twins, and Reeder that they were same-sex conjugal or domestic partners evidenced by iconography normally used for husband and wife, or, with Khnumhotep, for women (sniffing the lotus blossom).

See also
 Homosexuality in ancient Egypt

Notes

References

Literature
Ahmed Moussa & Hartwig Altenmüller (1977), Das Grab des Nianchchnum und Chnumhotep. Darmstadt, Germany: Philipp von Zabern. This is the generally accepted publication of the tomb. In German. 
James Allen (2005), The Ancient Egyptian Pyramid Texts, Series: Writings from the ancient world (23), Peter Der Manuelian (Ed.), Atlanta: Society of Biblical Literature. 
John Baines (2013). High Culture and Experience in Ancient Egypt. Bristol, CT: Equinox. 
Charlotte Booth (2015), In Bed with the Ancient Egyptians, Stroud, UK: Amberley.
 Thomas A. Dowson, "Archaeologists, Feminists, and Queers: sexual politics in the construction of the past". In, Pamela L. Geller, Miranda K. Stockett, Feminist Anthropology: Past, Present, and Future, pp. 89–102. University of Pennsylvania Press 2006, 
Linda Evans, Alexandra Woods (2016), Further Evidence that Niankhkhnum and Khnumhotep were Twins // The Journal of Egyptian Archaeology. Vol. 102, Issue 1, pp. 55-72
Uroš Matić (2018), Out of touch: Egyptology and queer theory (or what this encounter should not be) In: Von der Quelle zur Theorie. Von Verhältnis zwischen Objektivität und Subjektivität in den historischen Wissenschaften , Hrsg. Anne-Sophie Naujoks und Jendrik Stelling. Leiden: Mentis, pp. 183-197.
Ian Shaw, Editor (2000), The Oxford History of Ancient Egypt, New York:Oxford. 
William K. Simpson (2003) "Three Autobiographies of the Old Kingdom," in W.K. Simpson (Ed.), The Literature of Ancient Egypt. New Haven, CT: Yale University Press, pp. 401–413. 
 John Taylor (2001), Death and the Afterlife in Ancient Egypt, Univ. of Chicago Press. 
Emily Teeter (2011), Religion & Ritual in Ancient Egypt, New York: Cambridge University Press. 
Vera Vasiljević (2008), Embracing his double: Niankhkhnum and Khnumhotep // Studien zur  Altägyptischen Kultur. Bd. 37, pp. 363 -372
Leslie Ann Warden (2013) Pottery and Economy in Old Kingdom Egypt, Boston: Brill. 
Richard Wilkinson (1994). Symbol and Magic in Egyptian Art, New York: Thames & Hudson.

External links 

Virutal exploration of their mastaba
 John Hirst and Thierry Benderitter, "The Mastaba of Niankhkhnum and Khnumhotep," Complete virtual tour of mastaba. Osirisnet.net
Museum of Fine Arts Boston, "The Giza Archives." A trove on the Old Kingdom, including Giza Mastabas series and Reisner publications. Gizapyramids.org
Greg Reeder, "The Tomb of Niankhkhum and Khnumhotep." Schematic of pillars in forecourt; detail photo of both men's names inscribed on Türrolle of second vestibule; with bibliography. Emphasis on significance of tomb for the LGBT community. Egyptology.com
Mark Smith (2009), "Democratization of the Afterlife," UCLA Encyclopedia of Egyptology. More about diffusion of mortuary texts in Egypt. eScholarship.org
University College London, "Digital Egypt for Universities." Material on all phases of Egypt's religion and history. Ucl.ac.uk

Ancient LGBT people
Duos
Saqqara
Mastabas
People of the Fifth Dynasty of Egypt
Same-sex couples